Masum Türker (born 1951, in Mardin) is a Turkish politician and leader of the Democratic Left Party from 2009 until 2015. He was a minister of state in the 57th cabinet of Turkey.

Türker graduated from Istanbul University.

References

Önder Aksakal

1951 births
Living people
People from Mardin
Democratic Left Party (Turkey) politicians
Leaders of political parties in Turkey
Government ministers of Turkey
Istanbul University alumni
Deputies of Istanbul
Members of the 21st Parliament of Turkey
Members of the 57th government of Turkey
Ministers of State of Turkey